Forsythieae is a tribe of flowering plants in the olive family, Oleaceae.

Genera 
 Abeliophyllum Nakai
 Forsythia Vahl

References 

 
Asterid tribes